The 2015–16 Albany Great Danes women's basketball team represents the University at Albany, SUNY during the 2015–16 NCAA Division I women's basketball season. The Great Danes are led by sixth year head coach Katie Abrahamson-Henderson and play their home games at SEFCU Arena. They were members of the America East Conference. They finished the season 28–5, 15–1 in America East play to share the America East regular season title with Maine. They were also champions of the America East Women's Tournament for the fifth straight year and they received an automatic bid of the NCAA women's tournament where they upset Florida in the first round before falling to Syracuse in the second round.

On April 1 it was announced that Katie Abrahamson-Henderson has resign from Albany and accept her coaching position at Central Florida. She finished at Albany with a 6-year record of 144–46.

Media
All home games and conference road games will stream on either ESPN3 on AmericaEast.tv. Most road games will stream on the opponents website. Selected games will be broadcast on the radio on WCDB.

Roster

Schedule

|-
!colspan=12 style="background:#452663; color:#FFC726;"| Non-conference regular season

|-
!colspan=12 style="background:#452663; color:#FFC726;"| American East regular season

|-
!colspan=12 style="background:#452663; color:#FFC726;"| America East Women's  Tournament

|-
!colspan=12 style="background:#452663; color:#FFC726;"| NCAA Women's  Tournament

Rankings
2015–16 NCAA Division I women's basketball rankings

See also
2015–16 Albany Great Danes men's basketball team
Albany Great Danes women's basketball

References

Albany
Albany Great Danes women's basketball seasons
Albany
Albany Great Danes
Albany Great Danes